Embo (sometimes capitalized as EMBO; from "Enlisted Men's Barrio") refers to a collective term for barangays administered by the city government of Makati. The barangays were originally established to house military personnel of the Armed Forces of the Philippines. The area is part of the larger disputed Fort Bonifacio area which is claimed by the city government of Taguig.

Etymology
The collective for the Embo barangays were derived from enlisted men's barrios (EMBOs).

History

Part of the Embo area was formerly known as Mamancat, Masilang, San Nicolas, and Malapadnabato, respectively, all former parts of the town of Pateros. Mamancat (now Comembo) was known as a trading hub alongside its more developed neighbor, Aguho (now Barangay Agujo, Pateros) during the Spanish colonial era. San Nicolas, which comprises the present-day western portion of West Rembo, is the location of the Ermita de San Nicolas de Tolentino that was established in 1686 and is believed to be first settled by Chinese traders. Malapad-na-bato used to be linked to Pasig via an old bridge. Masilang comprises the present-day South Cembo.

At the end of the Philippine–American War, the United States colonial administration established the Fort William McKinley at the center of present-day Metro Manila. During World War II, the military reservation would be used as the headquarters of the United States Army Forces in the Far East (USAFFE) until the Imperial Japanese military took over it. After the conclusion of the war, the Philippines would be granted full independence by the United States in 1946 but retained control over its military bases.

Fort McKinley would only be turned over to the Philippine government in 1949. The reservation was renamed as Fort Bonifacio and the government made plans to create settlements for military personnel within the vicinity of the installation.

Cembo would be the first settlements among the EMBO barangays to be established. In 1949, when the first batch of enlisted servicemen from the Infantry Group, Philippine Ground Force from Floridablanca, Pampanga arrived to settle in the area. In 1954, East Rembo was established as settlements for Fort Bonifacio-based enlisted men serving in the armed forces upon the authorization of the Armed Forces of the Philippines through the office of General Alfonso Arellano, commanding General of Fort Bonifacio.

In 1956, two more more settlements would be authorized: West Rembo and Pitogo. In 1957, Comembo, in the site formerly known as Mamancat, would be settled by personnel from the Combat Engineering Group of the Philippine Army.

Pembo would be established to for personnel of the First Ranger Regiment, who were also known as the Panthers. In 1966, Cembo Annex was separated from Cembo proper and was renamed South Cembo.

President Ferdinand Marcos issued Proclamation 2475 which transferred control of the Fort Bonifacio area to the municipal government of Makati in 1986 which also reserved the area for military personnel and their dependents. In 1990, President Corazon Aquino issued Proclamation 518 to award land titles in the EMBO area to bona fide occupants.

In February 1996, a new barangay named Rizal was created from Pembo through Makati City Ordinance No. 96-010.

The Fort Bonifacio area including the Embo barangays would be subject of a territorial dispute between the city governments of Taguig and Makati. In 2022, the Supreme Court of the Philippines ruled that Makati should stop exercising jurisdiction over the Embo barangays although the Makati government has maintained that will continue to do so until it exhaust all legal remedies.

Subdivisions

The Embo barangays are constituted as subdivisions of the city of Makati. These barangays are part of Makati's 2nd congressional district. Barangay Pitogo is also grouped with other barangays with "Embo" in its name.

Education

All EMBO barangays have public elementary schools. However, public high schools are located only at some of the barangays. West Rembo in particular is designated by the local government of Makati as the city's Center of Education and Cultural Affairs. It is the site of various public schools of the city like the University of Makati, Fort Bonifacio High School & Benigno "Ninoy" Aquino High School, Fort Bonifacio Elementary School.

Religion
 
The Roman Catholic population is served by multiple parishes. The Mater Dolorosa Parish in East Rembo of the Amigonian Fathers and Brothers which was established on September 8, 1987 through a decree by Jaime Cardinal Sin. It originally covered the barangays of Cembo, West Rembo, East Rembo, Comembo, and Pembo. Cembo would later be transferred to the Our Lady of Guadalupe Parish. The Saint John Of The Cross Parish would be established for Pembo on August 9, 1991. On June 18, 1992, the Santa Teresita would be established in West Rembo. In 1998, a standalone parish for Comembo was proposed which was realized within the span of two years.

A locale of Iglesia Ni Cristo is located at Barangay Pembo.

References

Makati
Taguig
1949 establishments in the Philippines